The 2003–04 QMJHL season was the 35th season in the history of the Quebec Major Junior Hockey League. The league continued to expand to new eastern markets, with teams relocating to Maine and Prince Edward Island. Conferences were abandoned and teams were divided into three divisions by geography. Sixteen teams played 70 games each in the schedule.

The Lewiston Maineiacs became the league's second American-based team in history after the Plattsburgh Pioneers, and first to survive a full season. The P.E.I. Rocket also became the first major junior hockey team based on Prince Edward Island.

Rookie Sidney Crosby led the league in scoring as a 16-year-old, and won the Michel Brière Memorial Trophy as the MVP of the regular season.

The Gatineau Olympiques finished first overall in the regular season winning their fourth Jean Rougeau Trophy, and also won their sixth President's Cup, defeating the Moncton Wildcats in the finals.

Team changes
 The Hull Olympiques were renamed the Gatineau Olympiques.
 The Montreal Rocket relocated to Charlottetown, Prince Edward Island, becoming the P.E.I. Rocket.
 The Sherbrooke Castors relocated to Lewiston, Maine, becoming the Lewiston Maineiacs.

Final standings
Note: GP = Games played; W = Wins; L = Losses; T = Ties; OL = Overtime loss; PTS = Points; GF = Goals for; GA = Goals against

y-received first-round bye
x-made playoffs
complete list of standings.

Scoring leaders
Note: GP = Games played; G = Goals; A = Assists; Pts = Points; PIM = Penalty minutes

 complete scoring statistics

Canada-Russia Challenge
The 2003–04 season was the first time the Canada-Russia challenge was played. The event, then known as the RE/MAX Canada-Russia Challenge was hosted by the Halifax Mooseheads and the Rimouski Océanic. On November 20, 2003, the Russian Selects defeated the QMJHL All-stars 3–2 at the Halifax Metro Centre. On November 24, 2003, the QMJHL All-stars defeated the Russian Selects 6–2 at Colisée de Rimouski.

Playoffs
Each regular season division winner received a first round bye, and ranked 1st, 2nd, and 3rd overall. Remaining teams were ranked 4th to 13th, regardless of division.

Maxime Talbot was the leading scorer of the playoffs with 27 points (11 goals, 16 assists).

All-star teams
First team
 Goaltender - Martin Houle, Cape Breton Screaming Eagles
 Left Defence - Doug O'Brien, Gatineau Olympiques 
 Right Defence - Jonathan Paiement, Lewiston Maineiacs 
 Left Winger - Dany Roussin, Rimouski Océanic 
 Centreman - Sidney Crosby, Rimouski Océanic 
 Right Winger - Jean-Michel Daoust, Gatineau Olympiques 
 Coach - Benoît Groulx, Gatineau Olympiques

Second team 
 Goaltender - Corey Crawford, Moncton Wildcats 
 Left Defence - Mathieu Dumas, Val-d'Or Foreurs 
 Right Defence - Mario Scalzo, Victoriaville Tigres 
 Left Winger - Alexandre Picard, Lewiston Maineiacs
 Centreman - Maxime Talbot, Gatineau Olympiques 
 Right Winger - Steve Bernier, Moncton Wildcats 
 Coach - Alain Vigneault, P.E.I. Rocket

Rookie team  
 Goaltender - Julien Ellis, Shawinigan Cataractes 
 Left Defence - Nathan Welton, Quebec Remparts 
 Right Defence - Mathieu Carle, Acadie-Bathurst 
 Left Winger - Guillaume Latendresse, Drummondville 
 Centreman - Sidney Crosby, Rimouski Océanic
 Right Winger - Martins Karsums, Moncton Wildcats 
 Coach - no eligible candidate 
 List of First/Second/Rookie team all-stars.

Trophies and awards
Team
President's Cup - Playoff Champions, Gatineau Olympiques
Jean Rougeau Trophy - Regular Season Champions, Gatineau Olympiques
Luc Robitaille Trophy - Team that scored the most goals, Gatineau Olympiques
Robert Lebel Trophy - Team with best GAA, Cape Breton Screaming Eagles
Player
Michel Brière Memorial Trophy - Most Valuable Player, Sidney Crosby, Rimouski Océanic
Jean Béliveau Trophy - Top Scorer, Sidney Crosby, Rimouski Océanic
Guy Lafleur Trophy - Playoff MVP, Maxime Talbot, Gatineau Olympiques    
Telus Cup – Offensive - Offensive Player of the Year, Sidney Crosby, Rimouski Océanic
Telus Cup – Defensive - Defensive Player of the Year, Corey Crawford, Moncton Wildcats 
Jacques Plante Memorial Trophy - Best GAA, Martin Houle, Cape Breton Screaming Eagles
Emile Bouchard Trophy - Defenceman of the Year, Doug O'Brien, Gatineau Olympiques 
Mike Bossy Trophy - Best Pro Prospect, Alexandre Picard, Lewiston Maineiacs 
RDS Cup - Rookie of the Year, Sidney Crosby, Rimouski Océanic 
Michel Bergeron Trophy - Offensive Rookie of the Year, Sidney Crosby, Rimouski Océanic
Raymond Lagacé Trophy - Defensive Rookie of the Year, Julien Ellis-Plante, Shawinigan Cataractes
Frank J. Selke Memorial Trophy - Most sportsmanlike player, Benoît Mondou, Shawinigan Cataractes  
QMJHL Humanitarian of the Year - Humanitarian of the Year, Josh Hennessy, Quebec Remparts   
Marcel Robert Trophy - Best Scholastic Player, Nicolas Laplante, Acadie-Bathurst Titan
Paul Dumont Trophy - Personality of the Year, Sidney Crosby, Rimouski Océanic

Executive
Ron Lapointe Trophy - Coach of the Year, Benoît Groulx, Gatineau Olympiques        
John Horman Trophy - Executive of the Year, Sylvie Fortier, Baie-Comeau Drakkar 
Jean Sawyer Trophy - Marketing Director of the Year, Johanne Lefebvre, Baie-Comeau Drakkar

See also
2004 Memorial Cup
2004 NHL Entry Draft
2003–04 OHL season
2003–04 WHL season

References
 Official QMJHL Website
 www.hockeydb.com/

Quebec Major Junior Hockey League seasons
QMJHL